The Taipei Metro Huzhou station is located in the Neihu District in Taipei, Taiwan. It is a station on Wenhu line.

Station overview

This three-level, elevated station features two side platforms, two exits, and platform elevators located on the east and west sides of the concourse level.

The station is located at the intersection of Chenggong Road, Sec. 5 and Kangning Road, Sec. 3. It is 83 meters long and 21.5 meters wide, while the platform is 93.5 meters long.

The area around the station has many high-rise residential buildings and television stations. Because of its proximity to residential buildings along the Brown Line, it is the only station to have 3.6 meter double-curved walls to reduce noise levels. The station is also designed to fit in with the casual environment of local businesses.

Design
The theme for this station is "Dancing", with decorative art walls in the station.

History
22 February 2009: Huzhou station construction is completed.
4 July 2009: Begins service with the opening of Brown Line.

Station layout

Nearby places
Kang-Ning Jr. College of Medical Care and Management
Kanghu Park
PTS Foundation Building
Hakka TV
Taiwan Indigenous Television
Minghu Junior High School
Minhu Elementary School
Lihu Elementary School
Kang-Ning General Hospital
Financial Information Service Co., Ltd.
City Lake Hotel

References

Wenhu line stations
Railway stations opened in 2009